Isse or ISSE may refer to:

Places
 Isse, village and commune in north-eastern France
 Issé, village and commune in north-western France

Computing
 Information Systems Security Engineering
 Internet Streaming SIMD Extensions, an SIMD instruction set extension to the x86 architecture by Intel introduced in 1999
 Integer Streaming SIMD Extensions, an informal name for MMX extensions associated with 3DNow! extensions

Other uses
 Issé (opera), by André Cardinal Destouches
 International Secondary School Eindhoven, a school in the Netherlands
 International Students for Social Equality
 Hirsi Magan Isse (1935–2008), scholar and a leading figure of the Somali Revolution